The discography of English singer and songwriter Foxes consists of three studio albums, two extended plays, twenty one singles (including two as a featured artist), nine promotional singles and eighteen music videos. She is best known for her featured vocals on Zedd's song "Clarity", which peaked at number eight on the Billboard Hot 100 and Rudimental's song "Right Here", which peaked at number 14 on the UK Singles Chart, as well as a number of her own hit songs as the lead artist like "Youth" and "Let Go for Tonight".

On 18 May 2012 she released her debut EP, Warrior, working with Sam Dixon. In September 2013 she released her debut single "Youth" as the lead single from her debut studio album. The song has peaked at number 12 on the UK Singles Chart and number 21 on the Irish Singles Chart. On 31 October 2013 she revealed the name of her debut album to be called Glorious which was released on 12 May 2014 and peak at number 5 on the UK charts and has been certified silver in the UK. On 4 November 2013 she unveiled the album cover along with the track list through Instagram, including 11 tracks on the standard version and 16 on the deluxe version. She also worked with Fall Out Boy on a track called "Just One Yesterday" released alongside their album Save Rock and Roll in the same year. In February 2014 she released "Let Go for Tonight" as the second single from the album, which became her highest-peaking single to date, reaching number 7 on the UK charts and has been certified silver there. "Holding onto Heaven" was released as the third single in May, and became Foxes' fourth top 20 single.

On 5 February 2016 she released her second studio album titled All I Need and was promoted by 4 singles including the lead single "Body Talk" which was released in July 2015 and peaked at number 25 on the UK charts. Furthermore, in 2016, she was featured on a track called "Oasis" with Kygo from his debut album Cloud Nine. After a four-year hiatus, "Love Not Loving You" was released on 20 May 2020 as the lead single from her second EP, Friends in the Corner which was released on 1 April 2021. The EP was also preceded by four other singles; "Woman" on 29 July 2020, "Friends in the Corner" on 2 September 2020, "Hollywood" on 4 December 2020 and "Kathleen" on 17 March 2021 as the second to fifth singles respectively.

Studio albums

Extended plays

Singles

As lead artist

As featured artist

Promotional singles

Guest appearances

Music videos

Notes

References

Discographies of British artists